Zuwena "ZZ" Packer (born January 12, 1973) is an American writer. She is primarily known for her works of short fiction.

Early life and education
Born in Chicago, Illinois, Packer grew up in Atlanta, Georgia, and Louisville, Kentucky. "ZZ" was a childhood nickname; her given name is Zuwena. She was recognized as a talented writer at an early age, publishing in Seventeen at the age of 19. Packer is a 1990 graduate of Seneca High School, in Louisville, Kentucky.

Packer attended Yale University, where she received her BA in 1994. Her graduate work included an MA at Johns Hopkins University in 1995 and an MFA from the Iowa Writers' Workshop of the University of Iowa in 1999, where she was mentored by James Alan McPherson.

Career 
Her work was first published in the Debut Fiction issue of The New Yorker in 2000. Her short story in the issue became the title story in her collection Drinking Coffee Elsewhere. As Publishers Weekly put it, "this debut short story collection is getting the highest of accolades from the New York Times, Harper's, the New Yorker and most every other branch of the literary criticism tree."

"ZZ Packer’s Drinking Coffee Elsewhere is taught in creative writing courses across the country and with good reason. This short story collection is brimming with characters who are striving to find themselves, to understand themselves, and to survive", commented Pulitzer Prize-winning novelist Colson Whitehead.

Packer is currently working on a novel set during Reconstruction in the aftermath of the Civil War: "The subject is the Buffalo Soldiers; blacks who left the South, Louisiana in this case, and traveled to the West. You don't hear much about blacks in the West and I became really fascinated by them. I thought to justify my interest I had better write about them." A short excerpt from the novel was published in The New Yorker magazine's "20 under 40" issue. She has been regularly contributing to The New York Times Magazine and The New Yorker.

Works

Books

Anthologies

Other works

Awards

Other honors

Teaching

Fellowships

References

External links
Profile at The Whiting Foundation
From Matthew Klam to ZZ Packer: Some writers are worth the wait
Plotting her return
The Nobel Prize Waiting Game: A Year for Long Shots?

21st-century American novelists
African-American novelists
American women novelists
American women short story writers
Pseudonymous women writers
American historical novelists
Johns Hopkins University alumni
Writers from Louisville, Kentucky
Writers from Atlanta
University of Iowa alumni
Yale University alumni
1973 births
Living people
Baltimore City College faculty
Iowa Writers' Workshop faculty
Iowa Writers' Workshop alumni
People from Pacifica, California
Writers from Chicago
Radcliffe fellows
21st-century American women writers
Rona Jaffe Foundation Writers' Award winners
Seneca High School (Louisville, Kentucky) alumni
21st-century American short story writers
PEN/Faulkner Award for Fiction winners
Novelists from California
Novelists from Kentucky
Novelists from Illinois
Novelists from Iowa
Novelists from Georgia (U.S. state)
Stegner Fellows
21st-century pseudonymous writers
21st-century African-American women writers
21st-century African-American writers
20th-century African-American people
20th-century African-American women